Brigham Young University–Idaho (BYU–Idaho or BYU–I) is a private college in Rexburg, Idaho. Founded  in 1888, the college is owned and operated by the Church of Jesus Christ of Latter-day Saints (LDS Church). Previously known as Ricks College, it transitioned from a junior college to a baccalaureate institution in 2001.

BYU-Idaho offers programs in the sciences, engineering, agriculture, management, and performing arts. The university is broadly organized into 33 departments within six colleges and its parent organization, the Church Educational System (CES), sponsors sister schools in Utah and Hawaii. The college's focus is on undergraduate education, hosting 26 certificate, 20 associate, and over 87 bachelor's degree programs. It operates on a three-semester system also known as "tracks."

Students attending BYU-Idaho agree to follow an honor code that mandates behavior in line with LDS teachings, such as academic honesty, adherence to dress and grooming standards (which includes rules against wearing shorts and men having beards), abstinence from extramarital sex and homosexual behavior, and no consumption of illegal drugs, coffee, tea, alcohol, or tobacco. Approximately 99% of the college's students are members of the LDS Church and a significant percentage of the student body take an 18- (women) or 24-month (men) hiatus from their studies to serve as missionaries. Tuition rates are generally lower than those at similar universities, due largely to funding provided by the church from tithing donations.

History

The Bannock and Fremont Stake Academies
On November 12, 1888, the LDS Church created the Bannock Stake Academy in Rexburg. The precursor to BYU-Idaho, like several other colleges and universities across the mountain west, was established as a "stake academy" first, as Mormon settlers colonized the eastern Snake River Plain in the 1880s. As a stake academy, its purpose was that of a modern secondary school as public schools had not yet been established. As the population grew, it became necessary to divide the geographical area designated by the Church as the Bannock Stake. The Fremont Stake was created, and thus in 1898 the school was renamed the Fremont Stake Academy.

Ricks College
In 1903, the school was renamed again as Ricks Academy in honor of Thomas Ricks, the president of the LDS Church's Bannock Stake at the time it was founded and the chairman of the school's first Board of Education. By the early twentieth century, stake academies had largely been discontinued as public schools became more established in the western United States. Ricks Academy survived as it had added a year of college work to its curriculum and in 1917 was granted state certification, which allowed graduates to teach in the state of Idaho. At that point, it was known as Ricks Normal College with George S. Romney as its first president. In 1923, it was renamed Ricks College and functioned as a two-year junior college. It would serve as a junior college for most of the remainder of the twentieth century, except for a brief period from 1948 to 1956 when it operated as a four-year institution.

In the 1920s and 1930s, the LDS Church began to close, or hand over, its academies to state governments because of better established public education and economic strains on the church. Ricks College was offered as a gift from the church to the state of Idaho at the 1931 legislative session, but was rejected. Bills handing over Ricks College to the state of Idaho were presented at three more legislative sessions, (1933, 1935, 1937), but all were rejected. After almost a decade of facing closure, the church decided to keep Ricks College open. The college emerged with the support of local patrons and accreditation by the Northwest Association of Schools and Colleges in 1936.

The 1950s brought renewed consideration of closing the college and possibly moving it.  However, church president David O. McKay decided against this course of action after a visit to the campus. During the 1976 Teton Dam flood, Ricks College was used as a center for disaster relief operations.  By the late twentieth century, the college had become the largest private junior college in the country with over 7,500 students.

BYU-Idaho
On June 21, 2000, the LDS Church announced that Ricks College would become a four-year institution known as Brigham Young University–Idaho. This change became official just over a year later on August 10, 2001. Among the changes were the elimination of the intercollegiate athletic program and the institution of a larger activities and intramural athletics program. The college also established a "three-track" system which admits students on a specific track of two semesters (including the Spring semester) rather than the standard fall and winter semesters. Among other changes to campus facilities to accommodate the associated growth, the Hyrum Manwaring Student Center was renovated and enlarged and a new auditorium building, the BYU–Idaho Center, with seating for 15,000 was built. The buildings were dedicated in December 2010.

Campus

Off-campus facilities include a Livestock Center and the Henry's Fork Outdoor Learning Center near Rexburg. The Teton Lodge and Quickwater Lodge near Victor, Idaho, are utilized as student leadership and service centers.

The main campus includes a planetarium, an arboretum, and geology and wildlife museums. The college also operates several athletic fields and facilities around campus which are used to support intramural programs and the expanded student activities program that was instituted when intercollegiate sports were discontinued in 2001. Facilities include a football and track stadium, tennis courts, general use fields and the John Hart Physical Education building, which 4,000 seats in its main gym and is used for athletic events and concerts. The building also includes a large fitness center, a pool, auxiliary gymnasiums, racquetball courts and equipment room, all of which are open to students, faculty and staff. On December 17, 2010, the BYU-Idaho Center was dedicated and opened to students. The  building contains a 15,000-seat auditorium used for the weekly campus devotional, graduation ceremonies and concerts. The building also features a multi-purpose area with 10 basketball courts and can be subdivided by drop dividers as needed. The David O. McKay Library holds a collection of over 300,000 volumes with about 142,000 transactions processed by the library's circulation services annually.

In support of the fine arts and entertainment, the campus also includes the Ruth H. Barrus Concert Hall which houses the acclaimed Ruffatti organ, the third largest organ owned by the Church after those housed in the Salt Lake Tabernacle and Conference Center, respectively. KBYI-FM, a 100,000 watt public radio station, also broadcasts to eastern Idaho and parts of Wyoming and Montana from the campus.

Organization

BYU-Idaho is led by Henry J. Eyring, who began serving as president in April 2017. Along with other members of CES, BYU-Idaho is under the direction of a board of trustees, which includes the First Presidency, members of the Quorum of the Twelve, other general authorities, and presidents of auxiliary organizations. BYU-Idaho is organized into six colleges:

Academics

BYU-Idaho offers several associate-degree programs in addition to its bachelor-degree programs. Across the six colleges, there are thirty-three departments, offering over eighty-seven bachelor-level programs and twenty associate-degree programs. BYU-Idaho's engineering programs rank in the top 75 nationally.

The academic year is divided into three equal semesters (fall, winter, spring) of fourteen weeks and is known as the "three-track" system. It was instituted in 2001 as part of the transition from Ricks College to BYU-Idaho and the school's "Rethinking Education" campaign.  When a student is admitted to BYU-Idaho, they are also assigned to a specific two-semester "track," (fall-winter, winter-spring, or spring-fall) based partly on preference, degree program, and availability to balance.  Initially, the fall and winter semesters were slightly longer (and thus more heavily attended) than the summer semester and had more class options. Beginning in January 2007, the school adjusted the academic calendar equalizing the amount of time available in each semester, lengthening the class periods, and opening class offerings in the spring to allow more students to attend in the spring semester. There is also a short, 2-month summer session with accelerated class schedules.  BYU-Idaho also offers "fast grad" which allows students to attend all semesters and finish their degree sooner.  This is usually available as an option to students who have an upper sophomore or higher standing.

There were 20,592 full-time campus students enrolled at BYU–Idaho during the Fall 2019 semester. In addition to this number, during the Fall 2019 semester there were 13,952 students enrolled in BYU-Idaho online and another 4,543 campus-based students are taking online courses or fulfilling internships away from campus. Students come from all 50 states and more than 130 countries. According to fall 2016 enrollment numbers, 27% of BYU-Idaho campus students came from the state of Idaho, with the majority of students coming from five states: Idaho 27%, California 14%, Utah 10%, Washington 8%, and Arizona 4.5%. Thus, the student body at BYU–Idaho is notably homogeneous—not only due to its geographic representation but also due to ethnicity and religion. During the Fall 2016 semester, 83% of the students were Caucasian. Moreover, during the Fall 2016 semester, 99.7% of the students were members of the LDS Church.

Athletics

Ricks College Vikings
Known as the Vikings, Ricks College fielded an intercollegiate athletics program from 1919 to 2002 in the National Junior College Athletic Association, earning 17 national championships, 61 individual national titles, and producing nearly 100 first-team All-Americans.  National title wins included Women's Cross Country (1994, 1995, 1996, 1997, 1998, 1999, 2000, 2001), Men's Cross Country (1965, 1966, 1986, 1999, 2000, 2001), Women's Track and Field (1997), and Women's Volleyball (1974; AIAW). More than 25 alumni who played football for Ricks went on to play professionally in the National Football League or Canadian Football League.

It was announced in June 2000 that the athletics program would be phased out as part of the change from a junior college to a four-year college, due mainly to the costs associated with running a college athletic department, and the desire to develop a more comprehensive participatory student activities program.

Athletics as a four-year college
Since becoming a four-year institution, BYU-Idaho no longer hosts intercollegiate athletic teams but instead developed a competitive (or, as the school uses, "intracollegiate") athletics program which functions as part of Student Activities. Several teams from within the school compete against one another in a variety of sports throughout the year, complete with regular seasons and playoffs.

Student life

Latter-day Saint atmosphere 

The atmosphere at BYU–Idaho is different from most other universities due to its affiliation with the LDS Church. For example, almost every Tuesday that school is in session, a devotional is held on campus.  During the devotional, no classes are held, administrative offices close, and students and faculty are encouraged to attend the hour-long worship service either in person (in the BYU–Idaho Center), via campus TV, or on the radio at KBYI 94.3 FM. Speakers are selected from the campus and local communities, as well as from church general authorities who share a spiritually uplifting message. The school's honor code also requires students to regularly attend church services, which are held every Sunday.

Until the construction of the Rexburg Idaho Temple in 2008, BYU-Idaho had been the only college or university affiliated with the LDS Church that did not have a nearby temple.

Culture 
Despite its transition from Ricks College to BYU-Idaho, leaders of the college have maintained the desire to preserve what they call the "Spirit of Ricks," a campus tradition of service, hard work, friendliness, compassion and cooperation. The college's relative geographic isolation from a metropolitan area, combined with the strong moral standards taught and encouraged by the college and its sponsoring organization, contribute to a unique student culture with some similarities to the other campuses owned by the LDS Church. Alcohol and drug use is virtually nonexistent, as these substances are strictly prohibited by the school's honor code and the church. There is also no Greek system.

Much of BYU–Idaho student life revolves around events sponsored by the school organization Student Activities, which frequently hosts dances, concerts, sports events, and service projects.

Rexburg is situated in a strong northern climate in which winter dominates, and as such, winter sports such as downhill and cross-country skiing and snowboarding are popular. There are two nearby ski resorts, Grand Targhee and Kelly Canyon, which are frequented by students. However, Rexburg also experiences warm summers that are ideal for many outdoor recreational activities.  The proximity of BYU-Idaho to both Grand Teton and Yellowstone national park, along with other state parks, national forests and nearby rivers make hiking, fishing, camping, mountain biking, and river floats popular summertime activities.

Honor Code

All students and faculty, regardless of religion, are required to agree to adhere to an honor code. Early forms of the BYU Honor Code are found as far back as the days of the Brigham Young Academy and educator Karl G. Maeser. Maeser created the "Domestic Organization", which was a group of teachers who would visit students at their homes to see that they were following the school's moral rules prohibiting obscenity, profanity, smoking, and alcohol consumption. The honor code itself was created in 1940 at BYU and was used mainly for cases of cheating and academic dishonesty. Ernest L. Wilkinson expanded the honor code in 1957 to include other school standards (at the time, Wilkinson, as president of BYU, and the director of what was then the Unified Church School System, had some authority over all of the church's schools). The honor code today includes rules regarding dress, grooming, and academic honesty; it also prohibits extra-marital sex and  homosexual behavior, alcohol, coffee, tea, and drugs. A signed commitment to live the honor code is part of the application process for all Latter-day Saint affiliated schools and must be adhered to by all students, faculty, and staff. Students and faculty found in violation of standards are either warned or called to meet with representatives of the honor council. In rare cases, students and faculty can be expelled from the college for excessive misbehavior. In addition to the general honor code, other prohibited items include bib overalls, baseball caps (common at all Latter-day Saint schools, the BYU–Idaho Honor Code prohibits those items inside classrooms), shorts or capri pants, flip-flops (sandals), and also any worn, faded, or patched clothing on campus.

Students and faculty must receive an ecclesiastical endorsement to be accepted to the college. To receive this endorsement, applicants meet with their local religious leaders and pledge their willingness to abide by the honor code. Once admitted, students then meet with their ecclesiastical leaders annually to renew this commitment. Ecclesiastical leaders may revoke a student or faculty member's endorsement for any reason, which may lead to suspension or expulsion from the college.

Single students are required to live in housing that is approved by the college. All approved housing options are located within a mile of the college. Co-ed housing is prohibited according to the honor code but some complexes have separate buildings for men and women. Married students are not required to live in approved housing and may live wherever they choose.

Health insurance
As with most higher education institutions, full-time students are required to have health insurance. In fall 2019, BYU-Idaho announced that students may no longer receive a waiver that allows Medicaid to qualify as their health coverage. The decision brought significant media coverage. Students would have to seek other health insurance options, which may include purchasing the school's student health plan.  BYU-Idaho later reversed its decision, such that Medicaid would qualify under the requirement for students to have insurance.

Alumni

As of Fall 2017, BYU–Idaho had approximately 200,000 alumni, including those from the period when the institution functioned as an academy (equivalent to a modern high school).  The college's alumni include two-time Olympic gold medalist in Greco-Roman wrestling (2000) Rulon Gardner, Idaho State Senator Fred S. Martin, comedian Ryan Hamilton and professional baseball player Matt Lindstrom. Another alumnus is Marion G. Romney, a former counselor in the First Presidency of the LDS Church, who was valedictorian of the Ricks Academy class of 1918.

References

Sources

External links 

 

 
Buildings and structures in Madison County, Idaho
Education in Madison County, Idaho
Educational institutions established in 1888
Universities and colleges accredited by the Northwest Commission on Colleges and Universities
Universities and colleges affiliated with the Church of Jesus Christ of Latter-day Saints
Private universities and colleges in Idaho
Tourist attractions in Madison County, Idaho
1888 establishments in Idaho Territory